N61 may refer to:

 N61 road (Ireland)
 N61 road (Netherlands)
 Roxas Boulevard, in Manila, Philippines
 Nebraska Highway 61, in the United States